Artax (1995–2012) was a champion American Thoroughbred racehorse who won the 1999 Breeders' Cup Sprint and was the 1999 American Champion Sprint Horse.  He also won the Carter Handicap and Vosburgh Stakes and equaled or broke three track records.

Artax was named after a horse featured in the children's fantasy novel The Neverending Story.

During the 1999 running of the Maryland Breeders' Cup, an inebriated man (Lee Chang Ferrell) walked under the rail at Pimlico Racecourse on Preakness Day and stood in front of the field. As Artax came by, he attempted to hit him and the horse moved over several paths, making contact with other horses and wrenching his ankle. Ferrell was not injured. All betting money on the horse, who was the 4/5 favorite, was refunded.

Artax was retired to stud in 2000. He stood at several farms, including Clermont Farm in New York, Taylor Made Farm in Kentucky and Diamond G Ranch in Edmond, Oklahoma, before being moved to Haras Santa Tereza do Bom Retiro in Brazil. His most notable offspring include Diabolical, winner of the Alfred Vanderbilt Handicap, and Grade I winner Friendly Michelle.

Artax died on January 8, 2012, in an equine hospital in Brazil due to complications from colic.

References
 Artax's pedigree and partial racing stats

1995 racehorse births
2012 racehorse deaths
Racehorses bred in Kentucky
Racehorses trained in the United States
Horse racing track record setters
Eclipse Award winners
Breeders' Cup Sprint winners
Thoroughbred family 14-a